The 2001 WGC-NEC Invitational was a golf tournament that was contested from August 23–26, 2001 over the South Course at Firestone Country Club in Akron, Ohio. It was the third WGC-NEC Invitational tournament, and the second of three World Golf Championships events held in 2001.

World number 1 Tiger Woods won the tournament to complete a hat-trick of victories at the WGC-NEC Invitational and claim his fourth World Golf Championships title. Woods defeated Jim Furyk on the 7th hole of a sudden-death playoff after both men had tied at 268 (12 under par) at the end of regulation play.

Field
1. 2001 United States Ryder Cup team*
Paul Azinger (3), Mark Calcavecchia, Stewart Cink (3), David Duval (3), Jim Furyk (3), Scott Hoch, Davis Love III (3), Phil Mickelson (3), Hal Sutton (3), David Toms, Scott Verplank, Tiger Woods (3)

2. The leading 12 players from the European Ryder Cup points list after the PGA Championship and North West of Ireland Open
Thomas Bjørn, Darren Clarke, Niclas Fasth, Pierre Fulke, Pádraig Harrington, Miguel Ángel Jiménez, Bernhard Langer, Paul McGinley, Colin Montgomerie, Ian Poulter, Phillip Price, Lee Westwood

3. 2000 United States and International Presidents Cup teams
United States: Notah Begay III, Loren Roberts, Kirk Triplett
Tom Lehman did not play.
International: Robert Allenby, Stuart Appleby, Michael Campbell, Steve Elkington, Ernie Els, Carlos Franco, Retief Goosen, Shigeki Maruyama, Greg Norman, Nick Price, Vijay Singh, Mike Weir

*The Ryder Cup scheduled for 2001 would be postponed to 2002 due to the September 11 attacks.

Round summaries

First round

Second round

Third round

Final round

Scorecard

Cumulative tournament scores, relative to par

Source:

Sudden-death playoff

References

External links
Full results

WGC Invitational
WGC-NEC Invitational
WGC-NEC Invitational
WGC-NEC Invitational
WGC-NEC Invitational